

 
Burt Plain is a locality in the Northern Territory of Australia located about  south of the territory capital of Darwin.

The locality consists of the following land (from west to east, then north to south):
The Amburla and Yambah pastoral leases
The Hamilton Downs and Bond Springs pastoral leases, and 
part of the West MacDonnell National Park at its eastern end.

The locality’s boundaries and name were gazetted on 4 April 2007. It is named after the natural feature of the same name which itself was named in 1871 after A.G. Burt, a member of the team building the Overland Telegraph Line.

The 2016 Australian census which was conducted in August 2016 reports that Burt Plain had 250 people living within its boundaries of which 215 (85%) identified as “Aboriginal and/or Torres Strait Islander people.”

Burt Plain is located within the federal division of Lingiari, the territory electoral division of Namatjira and the local government area of the MacDonnell Region.

References

Populated places in the Northern Territory
MacDonnell Region